Believe in Love may refer to:

"Believe in Love" (Ravex song) 2009
"Believe In Love", 1988 single by The Scorpions from the album Savage Amusement
"Believe in Love", No.14 single by R&B singer Teddy Pendergrass, from A Little More Magic 1993
"Believe In Love", song by The Fourmyula	Mason 1970
"Believe In Love", single by Jackie Rae	Reed, Rae 1967
"Believe In Love", Christian song by Russ Taff	1988
"Believe In Love", single by Toni Arden P. F. Webster, Heinz Gietz 1956

See also
I Don't Believe in Love a song by progressive metal band Queensrÿche  1988
Do You Believe in Love the first top-ten hit for the American rock band Huey Lewis and the News 1982
Don't Believe in Love song performed by Dido
I Still Believe in Love
I Believe in Love (disambiguation)